McMahan is an unincorporated community in Caldwell County, in the U.S. state of Texas. According to the Handbook of Texas, the community had a population of 125 in 2000. It is located within the Greater Austin metropolitan area.

History
McMahan was originally called Wild Cat (also spelled Wildcat) and Whizzerville. Ambrose Tinney was given a land grant to establish the community in June 1832 and new settlers began arriving in the early 1840s. The Comanche Native American tribe attempted to kill Tinney but was unsuccessful. When it was known as Wildcat, it had an early store and a saloon. When it was called Whizzerville, there was a saloon on the opposite side of Tinney Creek. A post office was established in the community in 1898, but postal authorities thought the name Whizzerville was too long. They also accepted the name Raymondville. Residents chose the name McMahan to honor Edward J. McMahan, who built a store in the community in 1890. The settlement had two general stores and 75 inhabitants in 1914. Much of the community's economy centered around goats, cattle, sorghum, and cotton. It had a population of 200 settlers in the late 19th century, but lost half of its population during the Great Depression. It had six businesses in the 1940s and the population increased dramatically to 250 residents. It lost half of its population yet again in the 1940s. The post office shut down in the early 1960s and the population declined again to 125. Flooding had been an ongoing problem in the community and a flood-control project was completed on Tinney Creek to solve that issue. The community then organized the Southwest Texas Sacred Harp Singing Convention on April 28, 1900, and attracted visitors from around the state as an annual event. It was held on the weekend of the first fifth Sunday each spring and continued to be active today. The population of the community was 125 in 2000.

Today McMahan is known as “the quietest place in Caldwell County.” A former store sits across the street from the community’s old post office and homes in the area are almost hidden behind abundant foliage. The name Whizzerville also lives on in a few old signs and a street in the community.

The Southwest Texas Sacred Harp Singing Convention is still active in McMahan today and is held at the Bethel Primitive Baptist Church in the community. It is the second-oldest continuous Sacred Harp convention in the state and was originally called the South Union Singing Convention.

In November 2017, an 11-year-old boy accidentally shot himself in the upper torso with a handgun and was taken to the hospital along with his father, who suffered injuries to his hand. Police reopened the investigation of a 38-year-old woman who was shot to death in her McMahan home on December 27, 1993, as well as the disappearance of her husband and son.

Geography
McMahan sits at the intersection of Farm to Market Roads 713, 86 and 3158, ten miles east of Lockhart in eastern Caldwell County.

Education
In 1949, McMahan joined the Lockhart Independent School District and had a school called Round Top school. The community is still served by the Lockhart ISD to this day.

References

Unincorporated communities in Caldwell County, Texas
Unincorporated communities in Texas